Peadar O'Dowd is a local historian from the Bóthar Mór (Bohermore) district of Galway city and is a member of the Galway Archaeological and Historical Society.  He is an alumnus of University College, Galway.

Select bibliography

 Old and new Galway, Galway, 1985.
 Vanishing Galway, Galway, 1987.
 Down by the Claddagh, Galway, 1993.
 The Great Famine and the West, Galway, 2000.
 In from the West, the McDonogh Dynasty, 2002.
 Galway in Old Photographs, Gill & Macmillan, 2003. 
 A history of County Galway, Gill & Macmillan, 2004. 
 Christmas Tales of Galway, 2006.
 Final Tales of Galway, 2009.
 Tracing your Galway Ancestors, Flyleaf Press, 2011. 

People from County Galway
People from Galway (city)
Alumni of the University of Galway
Living people
Year of birth missing (living people)